Jon Amiel (born 20 May 1948) is an English director who has worked in film and television in both the UK and the US. After receiving a BAFTA Award nomination for the BBC series The Singing Detective (1986), he went on to direct films, including Sommersby (1993), Copycat (1995), Entrapment (1999) and The Core (2003).

Biography 
Amiel was born in London, to parents who grew up in the East End of London. Amiel's grandparents were immigrants Isaac and Mary Amiel – Polish and Russian Jews. He attended William Ellis School in Highgate, before studying English literature at Sidney Sussex College, Cambridge, graduating in 1969. It was while at Cambridge that he became involved with local theatre, and after college he went on to direct for the Royal Shakespeare Company.

After having worked as a story editor for the BBC, he directed the documentary The Silent Twins, and was chosen to direct the Dennis Potter serial The Singing Detective, for which he was BAFTA nominated. He made his feature film debut in 1989 with Queen of Hearts.

His most notable film is 1993's romantic drama Sommersby, starring Jodie Foster and Richard Gere. The film was a critical and commercial success, grossing $140 million worldwide.

Filmography

Film 
Director
 Queen of Hearts (1989)
 Tune in Tomorrow (1990)
 Sommersby (1993)
 Copycat (1995)
 The Man Who Knew Too Little (1997)
 Entrapment (1999)
 The Core (2003)
 Creation (2009)

Producer
 Simply Irresistible (1999)

Television 
 TV shows

TV movies

Awards 

1987 BAFTA (British Academy Television Award) Nominee for Best Drama Series: The Singing Detective (1986)
1996 Audience Award *Winner* at the Cognac Festival du Film Policier: Copycat
1990 Deauville Film Festival *Winner* of Critics Award and Audience Award: Tune in Tomorrow
1989 Montréal World Film Festival *Winner* of Montréal First Film Prize: Queen of Hearts
1990 Paris Film Festival *Winner* of Grand Prix: Queen of Hearts

References

External links 

1948 births
English film producers
English television directors
Living people
Film directors from London
British film producers
British television directors
Alumni of Sidney Sussex College, Cambridge